Percy S. Prince (April 7, 1882 – December 12, 1930) was an American football, basketball, and baseball coach at the Louisiana Industrial Institute—now known as Louisiana Tech University—and St. Stephen's College—now known as Bard College.

Prince graduated from Tufts University in 1906 and served as an assistant football coach at Tufts in 1907. He became the head football coach at Louisiana Industrial in 1909 and coached the football team through the 1915 season in which Louisiana Industrial won the Louisiana Intercollegiate Athletic Association (LIAA) championship, the program's first conference title. Prince also coached the Louisiana Industrial baseball team in 1910, tallying a mark of 14–4.

With the United States engaged in World War I, Prince left coaching to serve as a captain in the 1st Regiment of Infantry with headquarters at Monroe under Colonel Frank P. Stubbs Jr. Prince served as the Supply Company Commander. After his regiment landed in Brest, France, on September 3, 1918, Prince's regiment became part of the 39th Infantry Regiment and was eventually reorganized as the 156th Infantry Regiment. They were finally assigned to a training camp near Saint Florent. Prince was promoted from captain to major.

After the conclusion of the war, Prince returned to Ruston to coach the Louisiana Industrial football team for the 1919 season. HIs career football record at Louisiana Industria was 24–16–5.

In 1920, Prince moved to Annandale-on-Hudson, New York, to coach basketball and base at St. Stephen's College, which has since changed its name to Bard College. He left St. Stephen's in 1923.

Prince was born in Salem, Massachusetts. He died on December 12, 1930, at Delaware Hospital in Wilmington, Delaware.

Head coaching record

Football

Basketball

Baseball

See also
 List of college football head coaches with non-consecutive tenure

References

External links
 

1882 births
1930 deaths
Bard Raptors baseball coaches
Bard Raptors men's basketball coaches
Louisiana Tech Bulldogs and Lady Techsters athletic directors
Louisiana Tech Bulldogs baseball coaches
Louisiana Tech Bulldogs basketball coaches
Louisiana Tech Bulldogs football coaches
Tufts Jumbos football coaches
Tufts University alumni
United States Army officers
United States Army personnel of World War I
Sportspeople from Salem, Massachusetts
Coaches of American football from Massachusetts
Baseball coaches from Massachusetts
Basketball coaches from Massachusetts
Military personnel from Massachusetts